We Don't Care may refer to:
"We Don't Care" (Akon song), 2009
"We Don't Care" (Sigala song), 2018
"We Don't Care", a song by Audio Bullys from their debut album Ego War
"We Don't Care", a song by Kanye West from his album The College Dropout
"We Don't Care", a song by Børns from his album Blue Madonna
"We Don't Care", a song by Slaughter and the Dogs from their album Do It Dog Style
We (Don't) Care, a 2004 EP by MGMT
"We Don't care", a song by Audio Bullys from their album Ego War